Sergio Fernando Chamorro Fletes (born 25 November 1971) is a retired Nicaraguan footballer.

Club career
Chamorro made his national league debut for Walter Ferretti in 1987 against Chinandega and also played for local top side Real Estelí whom he joined in 1999.

From September 2005 he held out for almost 9 successive clean sheets and was unbeaten in 749 minutes, breaking the previous Nicaraguan league record of former Esteli goalkeeper Glen Omier.

International career
Chamorro made his debut for Nicaragua in an April 1991 UNCAF Nations Cup qualification match against El Salvador and has earned a total of 14 caps, scoring no goals. He has represented his country in 3 FIFA World Cup qualification matches and played at the 1995 and 2003 UNCAF Nations Cups.

His final international game was a June 2004 FIFA World Cup qualification match against St Vincent & the Grenadines.

Retirement and personal life
During his playing days with Walter Ferretti, Chamorro completed a degree in medicine which earned him his nickname el Docter. His study though denied him to play abroad. He is a specialist in orthopedics and traumatology doctor. In 1999, he married Dr Johanna Camacho and they have two sons named Alfredo and Andrés.

References

External links

1971 births
Living people
Place of birth missing (living people)
Association football goalkeepers
Nicaraguan men's footballers
Nicaragua international footballers
Diriangén FC players
C.D. Walter Ferretti players
Real Estelí F.C. players
2003 UNCAF Nations Cup players